Cianciana is a comune (municipality) in the Province of Agrigento in the Italian region Sicily, located in the middle valley of the Platani river, about  south of Palermo and about  northwest of Agrigento.

Cianciana borders the following municipalities: Alessandria della Rocca, Bivona, Cattolica Eraclea, Ribera, Sant'Angelo Muxaro.

History
The village is situated on the valley of the River Platani and is surrounded by the Sicani Mountains, and was originally inhabited the Cretans in the second millennium BC. Cianciana also was conquered by Greeks, Romans and Arabs.

According to local chronicles, a town known as La Ferla existed in the area in 1269. This was likely destroyed by an earthquake. Archaeological excavations have found traces of Roman temples and other constructions, including a "castle" called Casaletto di Chincana, whence the name given to the area in the feudal era of the Kingdom of Sicily.

Cianciana itself was founded on 4 October 1646 as Sant'Antonino di Cianciana, under the aegis of the Joppolo feudal family. In 1713 it had 2,303 inhabitants.

The center grew in importance after the discovery of the rich sulfur mines of the area, and the number of inhabitants reached 10,000.  However, after the sulfur mine closed in the early 1960s, rapid emigration to England, France, Germany, the United States, Canada and other parts of the world reduced the population by more than half.

Main sights
Clock Tower
Holy Trinity Mother Church (17th century).  The church was built by Baron Jerome Ficarra in 1640 and completed by the Joppa family.  Originally it had a nave, and in 1823 two aisles were added.  The vault of the nave was frescoed by the painter Caramel De Simone in 1839.  Inside there are, among others, two works of art: the statue of St. Anthony of Padua, the famous sculptor Jerome Bagnasco and the statue of marble of the Madonna.  Attached to the church is the Chapel of the Blessed Lady of Sorrows and Holy Cross, built in 1741, which houses a large painting by Fedele Tirrito,  The Deposition.
Carmine Church (18th century). The church has a small nave, with a facade that features a triple lancet window placed above the portal. The apse is decorated with small floral stucco and frescoes.
Purgatory Church (18th century). The church is dedicated to the Holy Souls in Purgatory and located in the town centre next to the Clock Tower.  It was built in 171 . The building, in Neoclassical style, is characterised by a portal in the limestone above which contains a fake rose painting. It houses a valuable statue of the Risen Christ School of Bagnasco.
St. Anthony Church (17th century). The church was built in Sicilian Baroque style by Prince Joppa was given to the Friars Minor, was opened for worship in 1866. The building is rectangular, has a single nave ending in an apse. The Church contains, in addition to several wooden statues, a painting of St. Anthony of Padua, painted on wood and a large painting representing the Madonna apparel painted by Accursio Torre.

References

External links
Official website
Cianciana Information website 
History of Cianciana (in Italian)
/ Giornale Siracusa
/ Sulfur in Sicily
Ray WinstoneRay Winstone

Cities and towns in Sicily